Rekoa is a genus of butterflies in the family Lycaenidae. The species of this genus are found in the Neotropical realm.

Species
 Rekoa bourkei (Kaye, 1925) - Jamaican hairstreak
 Rekoa malina (Hewitson, 1867)
 Rekoa marius (Lucas, 1857) - Marius hairstreak
 Rekoa meton (Cramer, [1779]) - Meton hairstreak
 Rekoa palegon (Cramer, [1780]) - gold-bordered hairstreak
 Rekoa stagira (Hewitson, 1867) - smudged hairstreak
 Rekoa zebina (Hewitson, 1869) - Zebina hairstreak

External links
"Rekoa Kaye, 1904" at Markku Savela's Lepidoptera and Some Other Life Forms

Eumaeini
Lycaenidae of South America
Lycaenidae genera